Chlorophorus annulatus is a species of beetle in the family Cerambycidae. It was described by Hope in 1831.

References

Clytini
Beetles described in 1831